Walter Weber (21 February 1879 – 4 April 1941) was a cricketer. He played in eighteen first-class matches for British Guiana from 1894 to 1910.

See also
 List of Guyanese representative cricketers

References

External links
 

1879 births
1941 deaths

Cricketers from British Guiana
Sportspeople from Georgetown, Guyana